The Soviet Union women's national under-18 and under-19 basketball team was the women's basketball side that represented the Soviet Union in international under-18 and under-19 competitions, until the dissolution of the Soviet Union in 1991. In 1992, CIS women's national under-18 basketball team represented the Commonwealth of Independent States in international under-18 competitions. After 1992, the successor countries all set up their own national teams.

FIBA Under-19 World Championship for Women

FIBA Europe Under-18 Championship for Women

See also
Soviet Union women's national basketball team
Soviet Union women's national under-16 basketball team
Soviet Union men's national under-19 basketball team
Russia women's national basketball team
Russia women's national under-19 basketball team

References

Women's basketball in the Soviet Union
National basketball team
Former national basketball teams
Women's national under-19 basketball teams
W